Karl Turner (born 29 November 1987) is an English cricketer who played for Nottinghamshire. Turner is a left-handed batsman and a right-arm medium-fast bowler. He joined the Academy at Durham in 2004 and played for their Second XI before moving to Nottinghamshire where a score of 185 in a 2011 Second XI Championship match against MCC Universities helped to earn him a place in the First XI.

References

External links
Karl Turner at ESPNcricinfo
Karl Turner at CricketArchive

1987 births
Living people
Cricketers from County Durham
English cricketers
Nottinghamshire cricketers
Northumberland cricketers
Cumberland cricketers